West Haddlesey is a village and civil parish in the Selby District of North Yorkshire, England. In the 2011 census, it had about 78 houses and a population of 214. The mouth of the Selby Canal lies to the south of the village and joins onto the River Aire.

The village was historically part of the West Riding of Yorkshire until 1974.

The village has a public house called the George and Dragon Inn, however it is temporarily closed due to a 'deliberate' fire in March 2019. The village shares a primary school with the neighbouring village of Chapel Haddlesey.

References

External links
West Haddlesey Information

Civil parishes in North Yorkshire
Selby District
Villages in North Yorkshire